The third season of Twin Peaks, also known as Twin Peaks: The Return and Twin Peaks: A Limited Event Series, consists of 18 episodes and premiered on Showtime on May 21, 2017. Developed and written by creators David Lynch and Mark Frost, with Lynch directing, the season is a continuation of the 1990–1991 ABC series and its 1992 theatrical prequel Twin Peaks: Fire Walk with Me. An ensemble of returning and new cast members appear, led by original star Kyle MacLachlan.

Set 25 years after the events of the original Twin Peaks, the season follows multiple storylines, many of which are linked to FBI Special Agent Dale Cooper (MacLachlan) and his 1989 investigation into the murder of Twin Peaks homecoming queen Laura Palmer (Sheryl Lee). In addition to the fictional Washington state town of Twin Peaks, the story extends to locations such as New York City, Las Vegas, South Dakota, New Mexico, and Texas. Showtime president David Nevins said that "the core of [the story] is Agent Cooper's odyssey back to Twin Peaks". 

The season garnered critical acclaim, with praise centering on its unconventional narrative and structure, visual invention, and performances. Many publications, including Rolling Stone, The Washington Post, and Esquire, named it the best television show of 2017. The film journals Sight & Sound and Cahiers du cinéma named The Return the second-best and best "film" of the year respectively, sparking discussion about the artistic difference, if any, between theatrical film and TV series in the era of streaming. In December 2019, Vulture critics named The Return the best television series of the 2010s, while Cahiers du cinéma named it the best film of the decade.

Synopsis
Twenty-five years after the cliffhanger ending of the original series, FBI Special Agent Dale Cooper (Kyle MacLachlan) remains trapped in the Black Lodge and prepares his return to the world. Meanwhile, Cooper's doppelgänger—host to the evil spirit Bob—lives in Cooper's place and works to prevent his own imminent return to the Black Lodge with the help of various associates. A message from the Log Lady (Catherine Coulson) leads members of the Twin Peaks Sheriff's Department to reopen investigations into the events surrounding the 1989 murder of homecoming queen Laura Palmer (Sheryl Lee). The mysterious murder of a librarian in Buckhorn, South Dakota attracts the attention of FBI Deputy Director Gordon Cole (David Lynch) and his colleagues.

Production

Background and development
The first season of Twin Peaks premiered on April 8, 1990, on ABC. It was one of the top-rated series of 1990, although its ratings declined in the second season. In subsequent years, Twin Peaks has often been listed among the greatest television dramas of all time. Aaron Spelling Productions wanted to continue the series for a third season but ABC canceled it because of declining ratings and high production costs. The studio instead decided to continue the series through a trilogy of feature-length films financed by the French company Ciby 2000. A prequel film, Twin Peaks: Fire Walk with Me, was released in 1992, but received negative reviews and a poor commercial performance, leading to the cancellation of the other two films in the series. Lynch and Frost tried to develop a spin-off series centered around Audrey Horne, but the pilot episode evolved into the unrelated theatrical film Mulholland Drive. In 2001 Lynch said that Twin Peaks was as "dead as a doornail."

In 2007 artist Matt Haley began work on a graphic novel continuation, which he hoped would be included in the "Complete Mystery" DVD box set. Twin Peaks producer Robert Engels agreed to help write it on the condition that Lynch and Frost approved the project; Haley said: "[Engels] and I had a number of discussions about what the story would be. I was keen to use whatever notes they had for the proposed third season. I really wanted this to be a literal 'third season' of the show." Paramount Home Entertainment agreed to package it with the box set, also on the condition that Lynch and Frost approved. Though Frost approved the project, Lynch vetoed it, saying that he respected the effort but did not want to continue the story of Twin Peaks.

In 2013 rumors that Twin Peaks would return were dismissed by Lynch's daughter Jennifer Lynch (author of The Secret Diary of Laura Palmer) as well as by Frost. Cast member Ray Wise recounted what Lynch had said to him about a possible continuation: "Well, Ray, you know, the town is still there. And I suppose it's possible that we could revisit it. Of course, [your character is] already dead... but we could maybe work around that."

In January 2014 a casting call for a "Twin Peaks promo", directed by Lynch, was revealed to be the filming of a featurette for the Twin Peaks: The Complete Mystery Blu-ray set. In September 2014 Lynch answered a question about Twin Peaks at the Lucca Film Festival by saying it was a "tricky question", and that "there's always a possibility... and you just have to wait and see."

Announcement
On October 6, 2014, Showtime announced that it would air a nine-episode miniseries written by Lynch and Frost and directed by Lynch. Frost emphasized that the new episodes were not a remake or reboot but a continuation of the series. The episodes are set in the present day, and the passage of 25 years is an important element in the plot. As to whether the miniseries would become an ongoing series, Frost said: "If we have a great time doing it and everybody loves it and they decide there's room for more, I could see it going that way."

In March 2015, Lynch expressed doubts about the production due to "complications". Showtime confirmed the season was moving forward, stating: "Nothing is going on that's any more than any preproduction process with David Lynch. Everything is moving forward and everybody is crazy thrilled and excited." In April 2015 Lynch said he would not direct the nine episodes due to budget constraints. He and Showtime came to an agreement, with Lynch confirming on May 15, 2015, that he would direct, and that there would be more episodes than the originally announced nine. At a Twin Peaks panel in Seattle, cast members Sherilyn Fenn and Sheryl Lee said that the new season would consist of 18 episodes and Angelo Badalamenti would return as composer.

Casting
On January 12, 2015, Kyle MacLachlan was confirmed to return to the series. In October 2015 it was confirmed that Michael Ontkean, who portrayed Sheriff Harry S. Truman and had since retired from acting, would not return for the revival, and that the role of town sheriff would be filled by Robert Forster, later confirmed as playing Frank Truman, brother of Harry. Forster had been cast as Harry in the 1990 pilot but was replaced by Ontkean due to scheduling issues. Also in October David Duchovny teased his return as Agent Denise Bryson. In November 2015 it was reported that Miguel Ferrer would reprise his role as Albert Rosenfield and that Richard Beymer and David Patrick Kelly would return as Benjamin Horne and Jerry Horne, respectively. In December 2015 Alicia Witt confirmed she would reprise her role as Gersten Hayward. Michael J. Anderson was asked to reprise his role as The Man from Another Place but declined.

Russ Tamblyn underwent open-heart surgery in late 2014 and was still recovering in 2015. Lynch and Frost still hoped Tamblyn would join the cast for the new season, which was later confirmed. On September 28, 2015, Catherine E. Coulson, who reprised her role of the Log Lady in the new season, died of cancer. She filmed her final scene four days before her death.

The season's first teaser trailer, released in December 2015, confirmed the involvement of Michael Horse (Tommy "Hawk" Hill). In January 2016 it was reported that Sherilyn Fenn would reprise her role as Audrey Horne in a "major presence." In February 2016 it was reported that Lynch would reprise his role as Gordon Cole. Frequent Lynch collaborator Laura Dern was cast in a "top-secret pivotal role", which eventually proved to be Diane, the previously unseen character to whom Cooper frequently dictated taped messages during the show's original run. In April 2016 a complete cast list was released, featuring 217 actors, with actors returning from the earlier series marked with asterisks. Mary Reber, who plays Alice Tremond in the finale, is the actual owner of the house used for the Palmer residence.

David Bowie was asked to make a cameo appearance as FBI Agent Phillip Jeffries, his character from Twin Peaks: Fire Walk with Me. As Bowie's health was declining, his lawyer told Lynch that he was unavailable. Before his death in January 2016, Bowie gave the production permission to reuse old footage featuring him, but he was unhappy with the accent he had used in the film, and requested that he be dubbed over by an authentic Louisiana actor, leading to the casting of Nathan Frizzell as Jeffries's voice. In January and February 2017, respectively, cast members Miguel Ferrer and Warren Frost died, but both appear in the new season. This was Ferrer's last live action television role before his death. Harry Dean Stanton, who reprised his role as Carl Rodd, died in September 2017, less than two weeks after the last episode of the season aired.

Filming

In July 2015 Frost suggested that the season would premiere in 2017 rather than 2016, as originally planned. The series began filming in September 2015 and Showtime president David Nevins said: 
In January 2016 Nevins confirmed that the season would premiere in the first half of 2017. The season was shot continuously from a single, long shooting script before being edited into episodes. Filming was completed by April 2016.

Music

The season's score contains new and reused compositions by Angelo Badalamenti, dark ambient music and sound design by Dean Hurley and David Lynch (including some from The Air Is on Fire), and unreleased music from Lynch and Badalamenti's 1990s project Thought Gang, two of which previously appeared in Fire Walk with Me. Hurley's contributions were released on the album Anthology Resource Vol. 1: △△ on August 6, 2017, by Sacred Bones Records. Several tracks from Johnny Jewel's album Windswept also appear throughout. Threnody for the Victims of Hiroshima by Krzysztof Penderecki appears in key scenes. 

Angelo Badalamenti's score was released on September 8, 2017, by Rhino Records as Twin Peaks: Limited Event Series Original Soundtrack.

Additionally, multiple episodes contain musical performances at the Roadhouse. Lynch hand-picked several of the bands, including Nine Inch Nails, Sharon Van Etten, Chromatics, and Eddie Vedder. Twin Peaks: Music from the Limited Event Series, an album containing many of these performances along with other songs heard on the season, was released by Rhino Records on September 8, 2017.

Other music, mostly played diegetically includes:

"American Woman" (David Lynch Remix) by Muddy Magnolias
"Take Five" by Dave Brubeck
"I Love How You Love Me" by The Paris Sisters
"I Am (Old School Hip Hop Beat)" by Blunted Beatz
"Habit" and "Tabloid" by Uniform
"Sleep Walk" by Santo & Johnny
"Green Onions" by Booker T. & the M.G.'s
"My Prayer" by The Platters
"Charmaine" by Mantovani
"Viva Las Vegas" by Shawn Colvin
"I've Been Loving You Too Long" (Live) by Otis Redding
"Sharp Dressed Man" by ZZ Top
"Windswept", “Slow Dreams”, “The Flame” by Johnny Jewel

Beethoven's Moonlight Sonata and "Last Call" by David Lynch are played slowed down significantly.

Cast

Kyle MacLachlan as:
Special Agent Dale Cooper
Cooper's doppelgänger
Douglas "Dougie" Jones
Richard
Cooper's Tulpa
Twin Peaks

Jay Aaseng as Drunk
Mädchen Amick as Shelly Briggs
Dana Ashbrook as Deputy Sheriff Bobby Briggs
Phoebe Augustine as Ronette Pulaski
Richard Beymer as Benjamin Horne
Gia Carides as Hannah
Vincent Castellanos as Federico
Michael Cera as Wally "Brando" Brennan
Joan Chen as Josie Packard
Candy Clark as Doris Truman
Scott Coffey as Trick
Catherine E. Coulson as Margaret Lanterman / "The Log Lady"
Grace Victoria Cox as Charlotte
Jan D'Arcy as Sylvia Horne
Eric Da Re as Leo Johnson
Ana de la Reguera as Natalie
Hugh Dillon as Tom Paige
Eamon Farren as Richard Horne
Sherilyn Fenn as Audrey Horne
Sky Ferreira as Ella
Robert Forster as Sheriff Frank Truman
Mark Frost as Cyril Pons
Warren Frost as Dr. Will Hayward
Balthazar Getty as Red
Harry Goaz as Deputy Sheriff Andy Brennan
Grant Goodeve as Walter Lawford
Andrea Hays as Heidi
Gary Hershberger as Mike Nelson
Michael Horse as Deputy Chief Tommy "Hawk" Hill
Caleb Landry Jones as Steven Burnett
Ashley Judd as Beverly Paige
David Patrick Kelly as Jerry Horne
Piper Laurie as Catherine Martell
Jane Levy as Elizabeth
Peggy Lipton as Norma Jennings
Sarah Jean Long as Miriam Sullivan
Riley Lynch as Bing
James Marshall as James Hurley
Everett McGill as Ed Hurley
Clark Middleton as Charlie
Jack Nance as Pete Martell
Walter Olkewicz as Jacques Renault and Jean-Michel Renault
John Pirruccello as Deputy Sheriff Chad Broxford
Mary Reber as Alice Tremond
Kimmy Robertson as Lucy Brennan
Wendy Robie as Nadine Hurley
Eric Rondell as Johnny Horne
Marvin "Marv" Rosand as Toad
Rod Rowland as Chuck
Amanda Seyfried as Rebecca 'Becky' Burnett
Harry Dean Stanton as Carl Rodd
JR Starr as MC
Charlotte Stewart as Betty Briggs
Jessica Szohr as Renee
Russ Tamblyn as Dr. Lawrence Jacoby
Jodi Thelen as Maggie
Lauren Tewes as Gersten's neighbor
Jake Wardle as Freddie Sykes
Alicia Witt as Gersten Hayward
Karolina Wydra as Chloe
Charlyne Yi as Ruby
Grace Zabriskie as Sarah Palmer

Government

Chrysta Bell as Special Agent Tammy Preston
Richard Chamberlain as Bill Kennedy
Laura Dern as Diane Evans
David Duchovny as FBI Chief of Staff Denise Bryson
Jay R. Ferguson as Special Agent Randall Headley
Miguel Ferrer as Special Agent Albert Rosenfield
Ernie Hudson as Colonel Davis
David Lynch as FBI Deputy Director Gordon Cole
Adele René as Lieutenant Cynthia Knox
Owain Rhys-Davies as Agent Wilson

Las Vegas

Alon Aboutboul as Head Mover
Joe Adler as Roger
Tammie Baird as Lorraine
Jim Belushi as Bradley Mitchum
John Billingsley as Doctor Ben
Ronnie Gene Blevins as Tommy
Wes Brown as Darren
Juan Carlos Cantu as Officer Reynaldo
Larry Clarke as Detective T. Fusco
Jonny Coyne as Polish Accountant
Giselle Damier as Sandie 
David Dastmalchian as Pit Boss Warrick
Jeremy Davies as Jimmy
Eric Edelstein as Detective "Smiley" Fusco
John Ennis as Slot Machine Man
Josh Fadem as Phil Bisby
Rebecca Field as Another Mom
Patrick Fischler as Duncan Todd
Meg Foster as Cashier
Pierce Gagnon as Sonny Jim Jones
Hailey Gates as Drugged-out Mother
Brett Gelman as Supervisor Burns
Ivy George as 5-Year-Old Girl
Robert Knepper as Rodney Mitchum
David Koechner as Detective D. Fusco
Jay Larson as Limo Driver
Andrea Leal as Mandie 
Bellina Logan as Female Doctor
Josh McDermitt as Wise Guy
Don Murray as Bushnell Mullins
Sara Paxton as Candy Shaker
Linda Porter as Lady Slot-Addict
Elena Satine as Rhonda
John Savage as Detective Clark
Amy Shiels as Candie
Tom Sizemore as Anthony Sinclair
Bob Stephenson as Frank
Ethan Suplee as Bill Shaker
Sabrina S. Sutherland as Floor Attendant Jackie
Naomi Watts as Janey-E Jones
Nafessa Williams as Jade
Christophe Zajac-Denek as Ike "The Spike" Stadtler

South Dakota

Jane Adams as Constance Talbot
Brent Briscoe as Detective Dave Macklay
Bailey Chase as Detective Don Harrison
Neil Dickson as George Bautzer
George Griffith as Ray Monroe
Cornelia Guest as Phyllis Hastings
Nicole LaLiberte as Darya
Jennifer Jason Leigh as Chantal Hutchens
Matthew Lillard as William Hastings
Karl Makinen as Inspector Randy Hollister
Bérénice Marlohe as French Woman
James Morrison as Warden Dwight Murphy
Christopher Murray as Officer Olson
Max Perlich as Hank
Tim Roth as Gary "Hutch" Hutchens
Mary Stofle as Ruth Davenport

Supernatural

Phoebe Augustine as American Girl
Monica Bellucci as herself
David Bowie as Phillip Jeffries
Nathan Frizzell as the voice of Phillip Jeffries
Robert Broski as Woodsman
Don S. Davis as Major Garland Briggs
Erica Eynon as Experiment
Sheryl Lee as Laura Palmer
Joy Nash as Señorita Dido
Carlton Lee Russell as the Jumping Man
Frank Silva as Killer BOB
Malachy Sreenan as Bosomy Lady
Al Strobel as Phillip Michael Gerard / MIKE
Carel Struycken as The Fireman
Ray Wise as Leland Palmer
Nae Yuuki as Naido

Michael J. Anderson did not reprise his role as The Man from Another Place, who instead appears as a treelike computer-generated effect and is voiced by an uncredited actor. When asked who provided the voice for the CGI character, executive producer Sabrina Sutherland replied, "Unfortunately, I think this question should remain a mystery and not be answered."

Other

New York
Michael Bisping as Guard
Benjamin Rosenfield as Sam Colby
Madeline Zima as Tracey Barberato

New Mexico, 1956
Leslie Berger as New Mexico Wife
Cullen Douglas as Disc Jockey
Tikaeni Faircrest as Girl
Tad Griffith as New Mexico Husband
Xolo Maridueña as Boy
Tracy Philips as Receptionist

Montana
Frank Collison as Muddy
Derek Mears as Renzo

Odessa
Matt Battaglia as Cowboy 3
Francesca Eastwood as Texas Waitress Kristi
Heath Hensley as Cowboy 1
Rob Mars as Cowboy 2
Sheryl Lee as Carrie Page

Notes

Episodes

Release

The season premiered on Showtime on May 21, 2017, with a two-hour episode. After the airing, the premiere and an additional two episodes became available online, and the season aired in weekly increments from that point onwards (at Lynch's insistence). Overall, the series consists of 18 episodes. It concluded on September 3, 2017, with a two-part finale.

In the United Kingdom, Sky Atlantic simulcast the first two episodes beginning at 2:00 am British Summer Time on May 22, 2017, and the next two episodes were released on Sky UK's on-demand service after the premiere. In the Nordic countries, the season is broadcast on HBO Nordic, with the two-hour premiere airing on May 22, and subsequent episodes being made available the day after its U.S. airing. In Canada, the season is available on CraveTV and The Movie Network, and debuted simultaneously with the U.S. broadcast. In Australia, episodes of the season are available to stream on Stan the same day as the original U.S. broadcast. In Japan, the season aired on the satellite television network Wowow, which also aired the original series.

Two episodes were screened at the 2017 Cannes Film Festival. The Return was screened in its entirety from January 5–7, 2018, at the Museum of Modern Art, as part of the museum's annual series on "the year's finest films".

Reception

On Rotten Tomatoes the season has a 94% rating with an average score of 7.8 out of 10 based on 459 reviews. The site's critical consensus reads, "Surreal, suspenseful, and visually stunning, this new Twin Peaks is an auteurist triumph for David Lynch." On Metacritic, Twin Peaks has a score of 74 out of 100 based on 26 reviews.

Sean T. Collins of Rolling Stone called the season "one of the most groundbreaking TV series ever", praising its original, complex storylines and the performances of its cast, particularly Kyle MacLachlan. Matt Zoller Seitz of Vulture wrote that the show was "the most original and disturbing to hit TV drama since The Sopranos". In his season review for IGN, Matt Fowler noted that Twin Peaks "came back as a true artistic force that challenged just about every storytelling convention we know" and scored it an 8.8 out of 10.

Of the season's two-part premiere, Sonia Saraiya of Variety wrote "Twin Peaks: The Return is weird and creepy and slow. But it is interesting. The show is very stubbornly itself—not quite film and not quite TV, rejecting both standard storytelling and standard forms. It's not especially fun to watch and it can be quite disturbing. But there is never a sense that you are watching something devoid of vision or intention. Lynch's vision is so total and absolute that he can get away with what wouldn't be otherwise acceptable."

The Hollywood Reporters Daniel Fienberg wrote of the season's format: 

In her "A" grade review of the premiere, Emily L. Stephens of The A.V. Club wrote of its possible reception by critics and viewers:

Lynch screened the two-hour premiere of the season at the 2017 Cannes Film Festival and received a five-minute standing ovation from the crowd.

Sight & Sound and Cahiers du cinéma magazines named Twin Peaks: The Return respectively as the second-best and the best "film" of the year, with Sight & Sound placing it behind only the psychological horror film Get Out. Metacritic ranked Twin Peaks the second-best TV series of 2017; 20 major publications ranked it the best show of the year. In 2019, Twin Peaks: The Return was ranked 22nd on The Guardians list of the 100 best TV shows of the 21st century.

Writer-director Jim Jarmusch called the season "a masterpiece" and the single best piece of American cinema from the last 10 years.

Critics' top ten lists

Ratings

The two-hour premiere on May 21, 2017, received 506,000 viewers on Showtime, which Deadline Hollywood called "soft for such a strongly promoted prestige project". Ratings increased to 626,000 after the encore broadcasts that night and the premiere also had over 450,000 viewers via streaming and on-demand.

Viewership for the premiere increased to 804,000 in Live+3 ratings, and it had a viewership of 1.7 million across streaming and on-demand platforms. Showtime announced that the weekend of the Twin Peaks premiere had the most signups to their streaming service ever. Prior to the finale, the season was averaging 2 million weekly viewers, when including time-shifting, encores and streaming. Showtime president David Nevins said that Twin Peaks "has exceeded expectations" from a financial perspective.

Awards and nominations

Home media
The season was released on Blu-ray and DVD on December 5, 2017, under the title Twin Peaks: A Limited Event Series. The set includes more than six hours of behind-the-scenes content.

In the 2017 Home Media Awards, which honor the year's best home video releases, Twin Peaks: A Limited Event Series won four awards: Title of the Year, TV on Disc of the Year, Best TV Movie or Miniseries, and Best Extras/Bonus Material.

Future
Lynch and Frost have expressed interest in making another season of Twin Peaks, but Lynch has noted that such a project would not immediately follow The Return, given that it took them four and a half years to write and film the third season. In June 2018, Lynch said the story was "calling", but that "there are a lot of disturbances"; in August, he said he was working through ideas with producer Sabrina Sutherland. In April 2020, he said "nothing was happening" regarding further Twin Peaks.

References

External links

 
Season 3

2017 American television seasons
American sequel television series